Jan Káňa (born January 4, 1992) is a Czech professional ice hockey player. He is currently playing for Olomouc HC of the Czech Extraliga.

Káňa made his Czech Extraliga debut playing with HC Kometa Brno during the 2011-12 Czech Extraliga season.

References

External links

1992 births
Living people
Czech ice hockey forwards
Sportspeople from Zlín
HC Olomouc players
HC Kometa Brno players
SK Horácká Slavia Třebíč players